Paenisporosarcina macmurdoensis is a bacterium from the genus of Paenisporosarcina which has been isolated from cyanobacterial mat from the Mc Murdo dry Valley in the Antarctica.

References 

Bacillales
Bacteria described in 2003